Governor Porter may refer to:

Albert G. Porter (1824–1897), 19th Governor of Indiana
David R. Porter (1788–1867), 9th Governor of Pennsylvania
George Bryan Porter (1791–1834), Territorial Governor of Michigan from 1831 to 1834 
James D. Porter (1828–1912), 20th Governor of Tennessee
Ludovic Charles Porter (1869–1928), Acting Governor of the United Provinces in 1922
Neale Porter (fl. 1860s–1890s), Chief Magistrate of Anguilla from 1869 to 1871